Colon commonly refers to:

 Colon (punctuation), a punctuation mark
 Colon (anatomy), a major part of the large intestine, the final section of the digestive system

Colon may also refer to:

Places
 Colon, Michigan, US
 Colon, Nebraska, US
 Kowloon, Hong Kong, spelled "Colon" in older books
 Colón, Panama in:
 Colón Province, Panama
 Colón, Putumayo in Colombia
 Colón, Cuba in Cuba
 Colón, Venezuela in Venezuela

People and fictional characters
 Colon (singer), Japanese singer
 Colón (surname)
 Evelyn Colon, formerly unidentified American victim
 Colons, another term for Pieds-Noirs (European settlers in French Algeria)
 Fred Colon, a fictional character in the Discworld universe
 Willie Colon (American football) (born 1983), American football player

Other uses
 Colon (letter), a colon-like character used as an alphabetic letter
 Colon (rhetoric), a clause which is grammatically, but not logically, complete
 Colon (CONFIG.SYS directive), usage of :label in DR DOS configuration files 
 Colon (beetle), a genus of beetles in the family Leiodidae
 Colon (grape), a French wine grape
 Colon classification, a library classification system

See also
 Colón (disambiguation)
 Cologne (disambiguation)
 Colonus (person) (in Ancient Rome)
 Columbus (disambiguation)
 Column (disambiguation)
 Isocolon
 Kolon (disambiguation)
 Koron (disambiguation)
 The Colóns (disambiguation)

he:קולון (פירושונים)
sr:Колон
tr:Koloni
ar:معنى المصطلح الإنجليزي Colon